1978 JSL Cup Final was the third final of the JSL Cup competition. The final was played at Okayama Athletic Stadium in Okayama on August 27, 1978. Mitsubishi Motors won the championship.

Overview
Mitsubishi Motors won their 1st title, by defeating Fujita Industries 2–1.

Match details

See also
1978 JSL Cup

References

JSL Cup
1978 in Japanese football
Urawa Red Diamonds matches
Shonan Bellmare matches